Patrick Spens may refer to:
Patrick Spens, 1st Baron Spens 1885–1973
Sir Patrick Spens, an old ballad